Lily Lake is a small rural village in Kane County, Illinois, United States. The village is in the far western part the Chicago metro area. It was incorporated as a village on November 6, 1990. The population was 993 at the 2010 census, up from 825 in 2000.

History
Lily Lake was originally called "Canada Corners" (after the large number of Canadians settled there) and was located further north. The settlement shifted its location when the railroad was built and changed its name to "Lily Lake", referring to a local lake.

Geography
Lily Lake is located in west central Kane County at  (41.942438, -88.470779), in the western part of Campton Township. Neighboring villages are Campton Hills to the east and Virgil to the west.

Demographics

As of the census of 2000, there were 825 people, 252 households, and 215 families residing in the village. The racial makeup of the village was 98.30% White, 0.85% African American, 0.24% Asian, and 0.61% from two or more races. Hispanic or Latino of any race were 2.06% of the population.

There were 252 households, out of which 55.6% had children under the age of 18 living with them, 78.2% were married couples living together, 5.2% had a female householder with no husband present, and 14.3% were non-families. 9.5% of all households were made up of individuals, and 3.2% had someone living alone who was 65 years of age or older. The average household size was 3.27 and the average family size was 3.55.

In the village, the population was spread out, with 34.1% under the age of 18, 5.7% from 18 to 24, 32.5% from 25 to 44, 22.5% from 45 to 64, and 5.2% who were 65 years of age or older. The median age was 35 years. For every 100 females, there were 114.8 males. For every 100 females age 18 and over, there were 108.4 males.

The median income for a household in the village was $98,642, and the median income for a family was $103,967. Males had a median income of $82,194 versus $51,717 for females. The per capita income for the village was $38,148. None of the families and 0.3% of the population were living below the poverty line, including no under eighteens and none of those over 64.

References

External links
Official website

Villages in Illinois
Villages in Kane County, Illinois
Populated places established in 1885